Khan Ataur Rahman was a Bangladeshi actor, producer, director, singer, lyricist and music director. The following list only focuses on his films as a playback singer, lyricist and music director:

1960s

1970s

1980s

1990s

2000s

2010s

2020s

Year Unknown

Background Score Only

Non-film albums

As lyricist

References

Sources
 

Discographies of Bangladeshi artists
Rahman, Khan Ataur